Harpalyce is a genus of flowering plants in the family Fabaceae. It belongs to the subfamily Faboideae.

Species
Harpalyce comprises the following species:

 Harpalyce acunae Borhidi & O. Muñiz
 Harpalyce alainii Leon

 Harpalyce arborescens A. Gray
 Harpalyce baracoensis Borhidi & O. Muñiz
 Harpalyce borhidii O. Muñiz
 Harpalyce brasiliana Benth.
 Harpalyce cristalensis Borhidi & O. Muñiz
 Harpalyce cubensis Griseb.
 Harpalyce ekmanii Urb.

 Harpalyce flexuosa Borhidi & O. Muñiz
 Harpalyce foliosa Borhidi & O. Muñiz
 Harpalyce formosa DC.

 Harpalyce hilariana Benth.
 Harpalyce lepidota Taub.

 Harpalyce macedoi Cowan

 Harpalyce macrocarpa Britton & Wilson
 Harpalyce maisiana Leon & Alain
 Harpalyce mexicana Rose
 Harpalyce minor Benth.
 Harpalyce moana Borhidi & O. Muñiz
 Harpalyce nipensis Urb.
 Harpalyce parvifolia H.S. Irwin & Arroyo
 Harpalyce pringlei Rose

 Harpalyce riparia São-Mateus, L.P.Queiroz & D.B.O.S.Cardoso
 Harpalyce robusta H.S. Irwin & Arroyo
 Harpalyce rupicola Donn. Sm.
 Harpalyce sousai Arroyo

 Harpalyce toaensis Borhidi & O. Muñiz
 Harpalyce villosa Britton & Wilson

References

Brongniartieae
Fabaceae genera
Taxa named by Martín Sessé y Lacasta
Taxa named by José Mariano Mociño
Taxa named by Alphonse Pyramus de Candolle